Clark W. Thompson (1825–1885) was a Canadian who served in the Minnesota State Senate, and the territorial House and Council for Minnesota Territory.

Personal life
Thompson was born at the Falls of the Twenty in Lincoln County, Canada on July 23, 1825 [6]. He married Rebecca Sophia Wells in the city of New York on 14 November 1865. He moved to Hokah, Minnesota in 1853 and worked as a miller before beginning his career in government. After finishing government service in 1872, he retired to Wells, Minnesota where he owned a farm. He died there in 1885.

Minnesota State Senate
Thompson was elected to the Minnesota State Senate on November 8, 1870; however, the Senate seat was initially given to George Whallon. Whallon served in the Senate until January 1, 1871 at which point it was given to Thompson. Thompson served in the position as senator for the remainder of the term until January 1, 1872. He served in district 20 where he represented Cottonwood, Faribault, Jackson, Martin, Murray, Pipestone, and Rock counties.

Other government service
Thompson participated in the Territorial Republican Constitutional Convention from July 13, 1857 to August 29, 1857. He also served as Superintendent of Indian Affairs for the U.S. Executive Branch (Lincoln and Johnson Administrations) in the Northern Superintendency from 1861–1865. In this capacity, he was supervisor of Ojibwe, Dakota, and Winnebago agencies in Minnesota as well as the LaPointe Ojibwe agency in Wisconsin. The U.S.-Dakota War and the subsequent removals of Minnesota's Dakota and Winnebago occurred during his term of office.

In 1863, Thompson arranged the removal of the Dakota and Ho-Chunk people to the Crow Creek reservation in South Dakota. The land he selected was dry, lacked game for hunting, and was not well suited for people accustomed to a woodland terrain. For six weeks after their arrival at Crow Creek, three or four people died every day from starvation or disease.

The people working above and below Thompson often sought political and business favors. They also encouraged Thompson to commit fraud, and he often went along. In 1863, he led a disastrous campaign to send goods from Mankato to the Dakota and Ho-Chunk at Crow Creek. The plan, called the Moscow Expedition by local papers, allowed Thompson to award lucrative contracts to business partners but delayed the delivery of food. Meanwhile, he ignored the dire situation of the people living at Crow Creek.

At the time, the government largely overlooked Thompson’s corrupt conduct. In 1861, special agent George E. H. Day accused Thompson of fraud in letter to President Lincoln that went ignored. Two years later, in a letter to Senator Henry M. Rice, Bishop Henry B. Whipple noted that Thompson brought $12,000 in gold to the Ojibwe annuity payment, but only $5,500 was paid.

Legacy
Thompson is the namesake of Clark Township, Faribault County, Minnesota and Fort Thompson, South Dakota.

References

External links
Journal of the Senate- Thompson v. Whallon Contested Election

1825 births
1885 deaths
Minnesota state senators
Canadian expatriates in the United States
Members of the Minnesota Territorial Legislature
19th-century American politicians
People from Houston County, Minnesota
People from Wells, Minnesota